Manuel Roberto Gadea (born 2 January 1942) is a Uruguayan basketball player who competed in the 1960 Summer Olympics and in the 1964 Summer Olympics. He was born in Montevideo.

References

External links
 

1942 births
Living people
Sportspeople from Montevideo
Uruguayan men's basketball players
1963 FIBA World Championship players
1967 FIBA World Championship players
1970 FIBA World Championship players
Olympic basketball players of Uruguay
Basketball players at the 1960 Summer Olympics
Basketball players at the 1964 Summer Olympics